Alma A. Hromic (born July 5, 1963), known by her pen name Alma Alexander, is a fantasy writer whose novels include the "Worldweavers" young adult series, The Secrets of Jin-Shei and its sequel The Embers of Heaven, The Hidden Queen, and Changer of Days. She is a native of Yugoslavia and grew up in various African countries, including Zambia, Eswatini, and South Africa, also spending time in England and New Zealand before moving to the United States. She lives in Bellingham, Washington with her husband.

In addition to her fantasy novels, Alexander has published a memoir about growing up in Africa and an epistolary novel (written with her husband, then an acquaintance from a Usenet newsgroup) about the NATO war in Yugoslavia. She has also published numerous book reviews, travelogues, essays, poetry, and other articles in various magazines (e.g., Swans) around the world. Her story "The Painting" won the 2000 BBC Short Story Contest.

In 2009, she donated her archive to the department of Rare Books and Special Collections at Northern Illinois University.

Bibliography
 Houses In Africa, David Ling Publishers (New Zealand), 1995 (as Alma A. Hromic)
 The Dolphin's Daughter and Other Stories, Longman (UK), 1995 (as Alma A. Hromic)
 Letters from the Fire (with R. A. Deckert), HarperCollins (NZ), 1999 (as Alma A. Hromic)
 Changer of Days Vol. 1, Voyager (Australia/NZ), 2001 (as Alma A. Hromic)
 Changer of Days Vol. 2, Voyager (Australia/NZ), 2002 (as Alma A. Hromic)
 The Secrets of Jin-Shei, HarperCollins, 2004   (also published in several other countries and languages)
 The Hidden Queen, Eos, 2004 (US edition of Changer of Days Vol. 1)
 Changer of Days, Eos, 2004 (US edition of Changer of Days Vol. 2)
 The Embers of Heaven, HarperCollins (UK), 2006 (also published in Australia/NZ)
 Gift of the Unmage (Worldweavers #1), Eos, 2007 
 Spellspam (Worldweavers #2), Eos, 2008 
 Cybermage (Worldweavers #3), Harperteen, 2009 
 "Shoes & Ships & Sealing Wax", Kos Books, 2010
 "Midnight at Spanish Gardens", Sky Warrior Books, 2011
 "River", Dark Quest Books, 2012 (editor)
 "Random", Book 1 in The Were Chronicles, Dark Quest BOoks, 2014
 "Dawn of magic" (Worldweavers #4), Sky Warrior Books, 2015
 "AbductiCon", Book View Cafe, 2015
"Empress", Book View Cafe, 2015
"Children of a Different Sky, Kos Books, 2017 (editor)
"Wings of Magic", Book View Cafe 2017

References

External links
 Official site
 Interview and reviews at FantasyLiterature.net

20th-century American novelists
21st-century American novelists
American fantasy writers
American women novelists
1963 births
Living people
Writers from Novi Sad
Yugoslav emigrants to the United States
Women science fiction and fantasy writers
20th-century American women writers
21st-century American women writers
Yugoslav expatriates in Zambia
Yugoslav expatriates in Eswatini
Yugoslav expatriates in the United Kingdom
Yugoslav expatriates in South Africa
Yugoslav expatriates in New Zealand